Mohammadabad (also Romanized as Moḩammadābād; also known as Muhammadābād) is a village in Markazi Rural District of the Central District of Dashti County, Bushehr province, Iran. At the 2006 census, its population was 1,837 in 413 households. The following census in 2011 counted 2,132 people in 540 households. The latest census in 2016 showed a population of 2,547 people in 689 households; it was the largest village in its rural district.

References 

Populated places in Dashti County